Christopher Stoll, born 1991 is an American author and illustrator who has been featured in magazines such as Popular Mechanics and Metro International as well as the websites Huffington Post, Comedy Central, Kotaku, and BuzzFeed. He is the creator of multiple self-published fantasy and science-fiction artbooks, and produces content relating to popular culture and the current state of art in America on his website and various social media outlets.

Career
Stoll began his career as a freelance illustrator, producing work for local businesses in and around Dallas, Texas. In 2013, he produced a series of fanart images of Disney Princesses as Avengers which were picked up and circulated by BuzzFeed, Huffington Post, and the now-defunct Disney-acquired website Babble. These images achieved momentary internet pop notoriety, and led one journalist to label Stoll an advocate of cultural inclusiveness and female empowerment.
This series led to Stoll's work reinventing pop culture characters through changes in theme and setting, such as his Pokémon-inspired "PokéNatomy," also widely circulated on Reddit, Facebook, Twitter, and other online forums.

In 2015 he ran multiple Kickstarter campaigns for his self-published artbook bestiaries, including "A Natural History of the Fantastic," and "The Feminomicon," an artistic guidebook chronicling mythical women from around the world based on the stylings of H.P. Lovecraft.

In late 2016 his "PokéNatomy" series of anatomical illustrations was featured widely, appearing in Metro magazine across Europe, Asia, and South America, as well as the Russian October 2017 edition of Popular Mechanics. In November 2016, Stoll raised $34,526 from PokéNatomy Kickstarter backers who were promised books that many reported still not having received as of September 2019, echoing experiences from his July 2015 Kickstarter project for his similarly self-published "A Natural History of the Fantastic." Although PokéNatomy is no longer available on Etsy, while not delivering to his Kickstarter backers, Stoll sold the book as "Multiverse Books" on the platform (27.9K in overall sales as of May 2021). Stoll's Kickstarter backers continue to voice their disdain in the Kickstarter PokéNatomy comments section cited above, most recently in April 2021.

Reception
Stoll's work was described as "a powerful way to flip princess culture inside out," by contributor Emma Mustich at The Huffington Post and similarly lauded on Comedy Central UK's website

External links
Stoll Art Portfolio

References

Living people
American illustrators
1991 births